The Conseil scolaire public du Nord-Est de l'Ontario (CSPNE, formerly the Conseil scolaire de district du Nord-Est de l'Ontario or CSDNE), also known as Ontario District School Board #56, manages the French-language schools in the north-east region of Ontario.

The CSPNE is a member of the Association des conseillers(ères) des écoles publique de l'Ontario (ACÉPO).

History 
Prior to 1 January 1998, the Francophone schools in the north-east region of Ontario were served by 4 different school boards:
Cochrane-Iroquois Falls, Black River-Matheson
Timmins
Kapuskasing
Nipissing

Elementary schools

High schools

Other public French-language school boards in Ontario 
There are 3 other public French-language school boards in Ontario:
Conseil des écoles publiques de l'Est de l'Ontario (CÉPEO)
Conseil scolaire de district du Grand Nord de l'Ontario (CSDGNO)
Conseil scolaire de district du Centre-Sud-Ouest (CSDCSO)

See also 
Association des conseillers(ères) des écoles publique de l'Ontario
List of school districts in Ontario
List of high schools in Ontario

References

External links 
School board 
Ontario Ministry of Education funding details for 2005-2006
Ministry of Education, School Board Information
Ministry of Education, School Board Profiles

Nord-Est
Education in North Bay, Ontario